Agelenopsis oklahoma is a species of funnel weaver in the spider family Agelenidae. It is found in the United States and Canada.

References

External links

 

Agelenidae
Spiders described in 1936